Sportanlage Rheinwiese is a football stadium in Schaan, Liechtenstein. It is the home of FC Schaan and has a capacity of 1,500.

See also
 List of football stadiums in Liechtenstein

Football venues in Liechtenstein
Athletics (track and field) venues in Liechtenstein
Sport in Schaan